Olga Sergeyevna Zabelinskaya (also transliterated Zabelinskaia; ; born 10 May 1980) is a Russian-born Uzbekistani professional racing cyclist, who currently rides for UCI Women's Continental Team . While competing for Russia, she won three Olympic medals, before changing allegiances to Uzbekistan in 2018.

Career
Born in Leningrad (now Saint Petersburg), Zabelinskaya twice became the junior world champion in 1997, in road and track individual races. She missed the 2004 Olympics because she was having a baby. In 2006, Zabelinskaya quit competitive cycling, but returned in 2009.

She qualified for the 2012 Summer Olympics in London, where she won bronze medals in both the road race and the time trial. Subsequently, she won a silver medal in the time trial at the 2016 Olympics. She is the first Russian female cyclist to win two Olympic medals in road events.

Doping
In July 2014 it was reported that Zabelinskaya had tested positive for octopamine at an international race in the spring. In February 2016, she accepted an 18-month ban, which she already served and which expired in September 2015.

Personal life
Zabelinskaya is the daughter of the Olympic champion former cyclist Sergei Sukhoruchenkov. She was separated from her father and they first met when Zabelinskaya was 16. She has three children. , she spends winters in Cyprus, where she trains, and summers in Saint Petersburg.

Major results

1997
 1st  Time trial, UCI Junior Road World Championships
 1st  Points race, UCI Junior Track World Championships

1998
 UCI Junior Road World Championships
2nd Road race
2nd Time trial
 2nd Points race, UCI Junior Track World Championships

2001
 3rd Time trial, UEC European Under-23 Road Championships

2002
 1st  Time trial, UEC European Under-23 Road Championships

2003
 5th Time trial, UCI Road World Championships

2006
 1st Stage 7b Tour de l'Aude Cycliste Féminin

2010
 1st  Overall International Thüringen Rundfahrt der Frauen
 National Road Championships
2nd Time trial
5th Road race
 3rd Chrono Champenois – Trophée Européen
 3rd Overall Route de France Féminine
 4th Memorial Davide Fardelli
 9th Overall Giro d'Italia Femminile
 9th GP de Plouay
 10th Trofeo Alfredo Binda

2011
 National Road Championships
2nd Time trial
10th Road race
 3rd Chrono des Nations
 4th Chrono Champenois – Trophée Européen
 5th Memorial Davide Fardelli
 6th Open de Suède Vårgårda TTT
 8th Trofeo Costa Etrusca
 9th Overall Energiewacht Tour
 9th Overall Iurreta-Emakumeen Bira
 10th Trofeo Vannucci Alberto

2012
 National Road Championships
1st  Time trial
8th Road race
 2nd Overall Giro del Trentino Alto Adige-Südtirol
 2nd Celtic Chrono
 2nd Celtic Chrono–Belfast
 Olympic Games
3rd  Road Race
3rd  Time Trial
 3rd Chrono Champenois – Trophée Européen
 5th Team time trial, UCI Road World Championships
 8th National Road Race Championships
 9th Overall Tour de Free State

2013
 UCI Road World Championships
4th Team time trial
7th Time trial
 4th Chrono des Nations
 5th Chrono Champenois – Trophée Européen

2014
 1st Overall Vuelta Femenina a Costa Rica
1st Stage 2 (ITT)
 1st Grand Prix GSB
 2nd Grand Prix El Salvador
 3rd Overall Vuelta a El Salvador
1st Stage 1 (ITT)
 4th Grand Prix de Oriente
 7th Trofeo Alfredo Binda-Comune di Cittiglio
 8th Overall Tour of Zhoushan Island
1st Stage 2

2016
 2nd Time Trial,  Olympic Games
 2nd Overall Tour of Zhoushan Island
 2nd Ljubljana–Domžale–Ljubljana
 2nd Chrono Champenois – Trophée Européen
 3rd Time trial, UEC European Road Championships
 4th Overall Gracia–Orlová
 UCI Road World Championships
4th Team time trial
4th Time trial
 5th Time trial, National Road Championships
 7th Overall Internationale Thüringen Rundfahrt der Frauen
1st Stage 2
 7th Crescent Vårgårda TTT

2017
 1st  Points race, National Track Championships
 UEC European Road Championships
3rd Road race
8th Time trial
 4th Chrono des Nations
 6th Overall Internationale Thüringen Rundfahrt der Frauen
 8th Team time trial, UCI Road World Championships
 8th Liège–Bastogne–Liège Femmes

2018
 1st  Overall The Princess Maha Chackri Sirindhorn's Cup "Women's Tour of Thailand"
1st Stage 1a (TTT)
 1st  Overall Tour of Eftalia Hotels & Velo Alanya
1st Prologue & Stage 1
 1st Ljubljana–Domžale–Ljubljana TT
 1st Chrono des Nations
 1st Stage 3 (ITT) Gracia–Orlová
 3rd Omnium, Six Days of Bremen
 7th Overall Emakumeen Euskal Bira

2019
Asian Track Championships
1st Points race
2nd Individual pursuit
3rd Madison
3rd Omnium
Asian Road Championships
1st Road race
1st Time trial
National Road Championships
1st  Road Race
1st  Time Trial
1st Aphrodite Sanctuary Cycling Race
1st Aphrodite Cycling Race Individual Time Trial
4th Grand Prix Justiniano Hotels
4th Grand Prix Alanya
4th Grand Prix Gazipasa
10th Grand Prix Velo Alanya

References

External links

 
 
 Profile on RusVelo website

1980 births
Living people
Cyclists from Saint Petersburg
Olympic cyclists of Russia
Olympic cyclists of Uzbekistan
Russian female cyclists
Uzbekistani female cyclists
Doping cases in cycling
Russian sportspeople in doping cases
Cyclists at the 2012 Summer Olympics
Cyclists at the 2016 Summer Olympics
Cyclists at the 2020 Summer Olympics
Olympic medalists in cycling
Olympic silver medalists for Russia
Olympic bronze medalists for Russia
Medalists at the 2012 Summer Olympics
Medalists at the 2016 Summer Olympics
Herzen University alumni